Deep End Live! is an album containing excerpts of the live performance by Pete Townshend's Deep End band, at the Brixton Academy in London, England on 1/2 November 1985. In addition to Townshend, the band included Pink Floyd guitarist David Gilmour, drummer Simon Phillips, keyboardist John "Rabbit" Bundrick, percussionist Jody Linscott, harmonica player Peter Hope Evans, the horn section Kick Horns and backing vocalists. The album was originally released in the U.S. in August 1986 by Atco Records.

The full concert was later released, as Live: Brixton Academy '85.

Apart from The Who and Townshend solo repertoire, Townshend plays R&B covers I Put a Spell on You originally done by Screamin' Jay Hawkins and Barefootin' by New Orleans singer Robert Parker. "Eyesight to the Blind",  a Sonny Boy Williamson composition which he did with The Who on "Tommy", is played here under an arrangement close to the original Williamson version. 

"After the Fire" is a song that originally appeared on Roger Daltrey's solo album "Under a Raging Moon written by Townshend. Townshend also plays on this album "Save It for Later", a cover of The Beat.

Track listing
All songs written by Pete Townshend unless otherwise noted.

Side one
"Barefootin'" (Robert Parker) - 3:09  
"After the Fire" - 4:36    
"Behind Blue Eyes" - 3:40 
"Stop Hurting People" - 5:09
"I'm One" - 2:36

Side two
"I Put a Spell on You" (Jay Hawkins) - 4:03
"Save It for Later" (Roger Charlery, Andy Cox, Everett Morton, David Steele, Dave Wakeling) - 4:10
"Pinball Wizard" - 3:00
"A Little Is Enough" - 5:20
"Eyesight to the Blind" (Sonny Boy Williamson) - 3:02

Bonus tracks
"Magic Bus" - 4:03
"Won't Get Fooled Again" - 6:08

References

Pete Townshend live albums
1986 live albums
Atco Records live albums
Albums produced by Pete Townshend